Louis Lejeune may refer to:
 Louis-François Lejeune (1775-1848), (Baron Lejeune), French general, painter, and lithographer
 Alexandre Louis Simon Lejeune (1779-1858), Belgian botanist
 Louis Lejeune Ltd., British maker of car mascots

See also
 Lejeune, a surname; also LeJeune or Le Jeune